WWE has held a variety of different professional wrestling tournaments competed for by professional wrestlers that are part of their roster.

Sporadic tournaments

The Wrestling Classic

The Wrestling Classic, also known as Wrestlevision, was a pay-per-view event that took place on November 7, 1985, from the Rosemont Horizon in Rosemont, Illinois. It revolved around a 16-man single-elimination tournament, and also featured a WWF World Heavyweight Championship match. Junkyard Dog won the tournament after defeating Randy "Macho Man" Savage.

Sam Muchnick Memorial Tournament

Frank Tunney Sr. Memorial Tag Team Tournament
The Frank Tunney Sr. Memorial Tag Team Tournament was a tournament held at Maple Leaf Gardens in Toronto, Ontario, Canada on March 15, 1987.

WWF World Heavyweight Championship Tournament (1988)

The main event at WrestleMania IV was a 14-man tournament for the WWF World Heavyweight Championship where "Macho Man" Randy Savage defeated "Million Dollar Man" Ted DiBiase to win the vacant WWF World Heavyweight Championship title.

WWF Intercontinental Heavyweight Championship Tournament (1990)
The WWF Intercontinental Heavyweight Championship Tournament was a tournament to decide a new WWF Intercontinental Heavyweight Champion after previous champion Ultimate Warrior was required to vacate the title after he defeated Hulk Hogan for the WWF World Heavyweight Championship at WrestleMania VI.

WWF Women's Championship Tournament (1993)
The WWF Women's Championship Tournament was a tournament to decide the new WWF Women's Champion after the title was reinstated after three years of inactivity.

WWF Tag Team Championship Tournament (1995)

The WWF Tag Team Championship Tournament was a tournament to decide new WWF Tag Team Champions after former champions Diesel and Shawn Michaels vacated the titles due to the two not being able to function as a tag team, which was won by The 1-2-3 Kid and Bob Holly.

WWF Tag Team Championship Tournament (1996)

The WWF Tag Team Championship Tournament was a tournament to decide new WWF Tag Team Champions after former champions The Smokin' Gunns had to vacate the titles due to Billy Gunn suffering a neck injury, the tournament was won by The Bodydonnas (Skip and Zip).

Kuwait International Tournament (1996)
The Kuwait International Tournament was a tournament held throughout a 1996 house show tour in Kuwait.

WWF Intercontinental Championship Tournament (1996)
The WWF Intercontinental Championship Tournament was a tournament to decide a new WWF Intercontinental Champion after previous champion Ahmed Johnson forfeited the title. He suffered (kayfabe) injuries to both kidneys when he was attacked by the debuting Faarooq after winning an 11-man battle royal.

Middle East Cup Tournament
The Middle East Cup was a tournament that took place in Dubai on December 2, 1996.

WWF European Championship Tournament

The WWF European Championship Tournament was a tournament to crown the first-ever WWF European Champion.

Kuwait International Tournament (1997) 
The Kuwait International Tournament was a tournament held throughout a 1997 house show tour in Kuwait. During the tour, Vader and The Undertaker appeared on Good Morning Kuwait where Vader attacked the host of the show when he asked about the legitimacy of professional wrestling; Vader was fined $164 by Kuwaiti authorities for the incident as well as being held in custody for several days.

WWF Tag Team Championship Tournament (1997)
The WWF Tag Team Championship Tournament was a tournament to decide new WWF Tag Team Champions, which was won by Owen Hart and The British Bulldog, with the winner facing Stone Cold Steve Austin and a partner of his choosing, which was revealed to be Dude Love.

WWF Intercontinental Championship Tournament (1997)

The tournament to determine the new WWF Intercontinental Champion was held between September 8 and October 5, 1997, with the finals occurring at Badd Blood: In Your House. The title was vacated due to a neck injury that champion Stone Cold Steve Austin suffered when he won the championship.

WWF Light Heavyweight Championship Tournament

The WWF Light Heavyweight Championship was first introduced in Mexico for the Universal Wrestling Association. It eventually migrated to Japan as well, though it was not considered to be an official WWF title until after 1997, when a tournament was held in the United States to crown a champion. Before the tournament, the title was a part of the J-Crown. The tournament ended on December 7, 1997, at D-Generation X: In Your House where Taka Michinoku defeated Brian Christopher to become the first Light Heavyweight Champion recognized by the WWF.

Brawl for All

The WWF Brawl for All was a shoot fighting tournament held in the World Wrestling Federation that lasted from June 29, 1998, to August 24, 1998.

WWF Intercontinental Championship Tournament (1998)
The WWF Intercontinental Championship Tournament was a tournament to decide a new WWF Intercontinental Champion after previous champion Triple H vacated the title due to injury.

Deadly Games WWF Championship Tournament

The Deadly Games WWF Championship Tournament was a tournament to decide a new WWF Champion after the title was vacated at the previous pay-per-view after Kane and The Undertaker pinned then-champion Stone Cold Steve Austin during a Triple Threat title match.

Undisputed WWF Championship Tournament (2001)

The Undisputed WWF Championship Tournament was a four-man tournament held at Vengeance on December 9, 2001. The tournament was created to unify the WWF and World Championships.

Undisputed WWF Championship #1 Contender's Tournament (2002)

The Undisputed WWF Championship #1 Contendership Tournament was a tournament to face Chris Jericho for the Undisputed WWF Championship at No Way Out.

WWE Tag Team Championship Tournament

The WWE Tag Team Championship Tournament was a tournament held  to crown the inaugural WWE Tag Team Champions, for the SmackDown brand.  The finals concluded at No Mercy (2002) and were won by Chris Benoit and Kurt Angle.

WWE Championship #1 Contender's Tournament (2003)

This was a tournament to determine the #1 contender for the WWE Championship. The winner faced champion Brock Lesnar at Backlash.

WWE United States Championship Tournament (2003)

The WWE United States Championship Tournament was a tournament to crown a new United States Champion after then-Smackdown General Manager Stephanie McMahon revived the title after two years of inactivity.

The tournament was held between June 19 and July 27, 2003, at Vengeance.

WWE Championship #1 Contender's Tournament (February 2005)

The tournament to determine the number one contender for the WWE Championship match at WrestleMania 21 was held between February 1 and February 20, 2005. At WrestleMania 21, John Cena defeated John "Bradshaw" Layfield to become the new champion.

WWE Championship #1 Contender's Tournament (April 2005)

The WWE Championship #1 Contender's Tournament was a tournament where the winner faced champion John Cena at Judgment Day.

Gold Rush Tournament (2005)
The Gold Rush Tournament was a tournament to determine the new #1 contender for World Heavyweight Champion Batista. Edge won the tournament but lost to Batista on the May 23 episode of Raw.

Road to WrestleMania Tournament
The Road to WrestleMania Tournament was a tournament to crown a #1 contender for John Cena's WWE Championship at WrestleMania 22.

WWE Women's Championship Tournament (2006)

The WWE Women's Championship Tournament was a tournament to crown a new WWE Women's Champion after champion Trish Stratus retired from her wrestling career. The first round started on September 25, 2006, and ended at Cyber Sunday when Lita, who Stratus defeated in her retirement match, defeated Mickie James.

ECW World Championship Tournament

The ECW World Championship Tournament was a tournament created to determine a new ECW World Champion after Bobby Lashley vacated his championship due to being drafted to Raw on June 11, 2007. The finals took place at Vengeance: Night of Champions. This tournament is notable because one of the semi final rounds was Chris Benoits final match. The tournament final was supposed to be Benoit vs CM Punk but Benoit no showed the event and was replaced by Johnny Nitro, who would go on to win the title. It was reported the day after the event that Benoit, his wife Nancy and their son Daniel were found dead in their home in suburban Atlanta. The day after police ruled that Benoit himself had killed his wife and son before committing suicide. This event has gone on to be known as the Chris Benoit double murder and suicide.

Championship Competition Tournament
The Championship Competition Tournament was a tournament held on SmackDown! in 2007 to determine the #1 contender for the World Heavyweight Championship at Unforgiven.

Championship Chase Tournament
The Championship Chase Tournament was a tournament held on the May 9, 2008 episode of SmackDown to determine The Undertaker's opponent for the vacant World Heavyweight Championship at Judgment Day.

WWE Intercontinental Championship #1 Contender's Tournament (2008)

A tournament was announced to crown a new #1 contender for William Regal's WWE Intercontinental Championship. CM Punk won the tournament by defeating Rey Mysterio in the tournament final at Armageddon.

Race To The Rumble Tournament
The Race To The Rumble Tournament was a tournament held in 2008 to determine a #1 contender for the World Heavyweight Championship at the 2009 Royal Rumble.

ECW Homecoming Tournament
The ECW Homecoming Tournament was a tournament held in 2009 to crown a #1 contender for the ECW Championship at the 2010 Royal Rumble.

WWE Divas Championship Tournament

A tournament was announced to crown a new WWE Divas Champion after former champion Melina was stripped of the title due to injury. The first round started on January 4, 2010.

The final tournament was originally scheduled at Elimination Chamber, but when official consultant to the  SmackDown General Manager, Vickie Guerrero interrupted, she was changing the match to an interbrand Divas tag team match, facing LayCool (Michelle McCool and Layla) from SmackDown. The final was held at the following night of Raw.

WWE Intercontinental Championship Tournament (2010)
The WWE Intercontinental Championship Tournament was a tournament to crown a new Intercontinental Champion. On May 7, 2010, after failed attempts of getting Intercontinental Champion Drew McIntyre to stop attacking Matt Hardy, Smackdown General Manager Theodore Long fired McIntyre and vacated the title. The following week, Kofi Kingston won a tournament to become the new champion, but Mr. McMahon reverted Long's decision. Due to the decision by Mr. McMahon, the vacancy of the title and Kingston's championship win are not recognized as WWE continued to recognize McIntyre as champion during that period. At Over the Limit, Kingston defeated McIntyre to win his second official Intercontinental Championship.

WWE Championship Tournament (2011)
On the July 18, 2011, edition of WWE Raw, the WWE Championship was vacated, after champion CM Punk left WWE. The title was put up in a tournament featuring the top eight wrestlers. The finals of the tournament would take place on the July 25 episode of Raw, which was won by Rey Mysterio.

Gold Rush Tournament (2012)

On the August 1, 2012 edition of NXT, NXT Commissioner Dusty Rhodes announced a "Gold Rush" tournament, featuring 4 developmental roster NXT Superstars and 4 main roster WWE Superstars to determine the inaugural NXT Champion in a knockout system format. The first NXT Champion was crowned on July 26, 2012, with Seth Rollins defeating Jinder Mahal in the tournament finals.

WWE Tag Team Championship #1 Contender's Tournament (2012)

The WWE Tag Team Championship Tournament was a #1 contender's tag team tournament, where the winning team faced Team Hell No (Kane and Daniel Bryan) for the WWE Tag Team Championship.

NXT Tag Team Championship Tournament

The NXT Tag Team Championship was introduced on the January 23, 2013 edition of NXT where it was announced by special guest Shawn Michaels that there would be a tournament to crown the first new champions.

Royal Rumble Entry Tournament
The Royal Rumble Entry Tournament was a tournament on NXT where the winner entered the 2013 Royal Rumble Match.

NXT Women's Championship Tournament (2013)

The championship was first introduced on April 5, 2013, at WrestleMania Axxess. It was announced at the May 30, 2013 tapings (broadcast on the June 5 episode) of WWE NXT (TV series), by Stephanie McMahon that there would be a tournament, featuring four developmental female talents and four female talents from the main roster competing to be crowned as the inaugural NXT Women's Champion in a knockout system format. The first NXT Women's Champion was crowned on June 20, 2013, with Paige defeating Emma in the tournament finals.

WWE Intercontinental Championship #1 Contender's Tournament (2014)

In April 2014, the WWE held the Intercontinental Championship Tournament to determine the #1 contenders to face Big E for the WWE Intercontinental Championship at Extreme Rules 2014. Bad News Barrett defeated Rob Van Dam in the final and defeated Big E to win the title.

NXT Women's Championship Tournament (2014)

On April 24, 2014, Paige was stripped of the NXT Women's Championship, by NXT's commissioner John Bradshaw Layfield, because she could not defend both the NXT Women's and WWE Divas Championship, ending her reign at 308 days. Right after, during the tapings for the May shows, a tournament was announced to take place to determine the next champion. Charlotte defeated Natalya at NXT TakeOver on May 29, 2014, to become the new champion.

NXT Tag Team Championship #1 Contender's Tournament
The championship tournament started on August 7, 2014, and there would be new #1 contenders for the titles. The tournament final was held on September 4, 2014. The Lucha Dragons (Kalisto and Sin Cara) won the tournament and defeated The Ascension (Konnor and Viktor) at NXT TakeOver: Fatal 4-Way on September 11, 2014, to win the titles.

NXT Championship #1 Contender's Tournament

The NXT Championship Tournament started on January 21, 2015, and there would be a new #1 Contender's for the title. The tournament final was held on February 11, 2015, at NXT TakeOver: Rival. Finn Bálor went on to win the tournament defeated Adrian Neville in the final.

Andre the Giant Memorial Battle Royal Qualifying Tournament
The Andre the Giant Memorial Battle Royal Qualifying Tournament was a tournament at WrestleMania Axxess for a spot in the André the Giant Memorial Battle Royal.

WWE World Heavyweight Championship Tournament (2015)

On  November 5, 2015, the WWE World Heavyweight Championship was vacated, after champion Seth Rollins suffered a knee injury.

Immediately after the final match, Sheamus cashed in his Money in the Bank contract and pinned Reigns. Therefore, Reigns' championship reign lasted only five minutes and fifteen seconds (later used to antagonize Reigns).

WWE Tag Team Championship #1 Contender's Tournament (2016)

This tournament was to determine the new #1 Contenders to The New Day's WWE Tag Team Championships.

The final match ended in a no contest after Enzo Amore suffered a legitimate concussion. Not far into the match, Amore was thrown into the ropes by Simon Gotch. Amore attempted to slide under the ropes, but instead hit his head on the middle rope and the mat, before falling on the floor, appearing to be unconscious. With the ending of the match, the Vaudevillains were given a WWE Tag Team Championship match, but they were defeated by The New Day.

Cruiserweight Classic

The Cruiserweight Classic saw thirty-two of the world's best cruiserweights battle it out to be crowned WWE's first WWE Cruiserweight Classic winner. The tournament was filmed at Full Sail University, Florida from June 20–24, and was broadcast on the WWE Network from July 13. It ran for ten episodes, with the finale being broadcast on September 14.

WWE SmackDown Tag Team Championship Tournament (2016)

Following the reintroduction of the WWE brand extension and subsequent draft on July 19, 2016, WWE Tag Team Champions The New Day were drafted to Raw, leaving SmackDown without a tag team championship. Over the course of the following month, SmackDown General Manager Daniel Bryan stated that he wanted to build up the tag team division before introducing a championship. Immediately following SummerSlam on the August 23, 2016 episode of SmackDown Live, Bryan and SmackDown Commissioner Shane McMahon unveiled the WWE SmackDown Tag Team Championship and announced a tournament, which culminated in a tag team match at Backlash to determine the inaugural champions. The tournament and the titles were won by Heath Slater and Rhyno after they defeated The Usos at Backlash.

WWE United Kingdom Championship Tournament (2017)

The United Kingdom Championship Tournament was a  professional wrestling tournament produced by WWE, that aired exclusively on the WWE Network. The first round took place on January 14, 2017, while the finals occurred on January 15, 2017. The tournament was held at the Empress Ballroom in Blackpool, Lancashire, England and crowned the inaugural WWE United Kingdom Champion.

WWE United States Championship Tournament (2017–18)
At Clash of Champions 2017, Dolph Ziggler won the United States Championship by defeating defending champion Baron Corbin and Bobby Roode in a triple threat match. On the following episode of SmackDown Live, after recapping all of his previous accolades, Ziggler said that the WWE Universe did not deserve him and he dropped the title in the ring and left. After unsuccessful attempts at contacting Ziggler, SmackDown General Manager Daniel Bryan declared the title vacant and announced a tournament to crown a new champion. The final was originally scheduled to occur at the 2018 Royal Rumble, but was moved up to the January 23 episode of SmackDown Live. However, on the January 16 episode, after Jinder Mahal and Bobby Roode won their respective semifinals matches, Roode challenged Mahal to have the final that night and Bryan scheduled it for that episode's main event.

WWE Cruiserweight Championship Tournament

At the 2018 Royal Rumble, Enzo Amore was scheduled to defend the WWE Cruiserweight Championship against Cedric Alexander. However, after Amore was suspended from WWE on January 22 due to allegations of sexual harassment and sexual assault, the match was cancelled. The following day, Amore was released and the title was vacated. It was then announced that a general manager would be appointed for 205 Live and would address the championship; 205 Live was previously controlled by the Raw General Manager, as 205 Live is part of the Raw brand. On the January 30 episode of 205 Live, Drake Maverick (formerly known as Rockstar Spud in Impact Wrestling) was appointed as the 205 Live General Manager. Maverick announced that there would be a 16-man single elimination tournament to crown a new WWE Cruiserweight Champion, with the finals to occur during the pre-show for WrestleMania 34.

WWE United Kingdom Championship Invitational
As part of WrestleMania Axxess, the winner of the WWE United Kingdom Championship Invitational received a championship match against WWE United Kingdom Champion Pete Dunne on the morning of April 8, 2018.

NXT North American Championship Invitational
As part of WrestleMania Axxess, the winner of the NXT North American Championship Invitational received an NXT North American Championship match on the morning of April 8, 2018. The defending champion, Adam Cole, was determined the night before at NXT TakeOver: New Orleans.

NXT Tag Team Championship Invitational
As part of WrestleMania Axxess, the winner of the NXT Tag Team Championship Invitational received an NXT Tag Team Championship match on the morning of April 8, 2018. The defending champions, The Undisputed Era, were determined the night before at NXT TakeOver: New Orleans.

NXT Women's Championship Invitational
As part of WrestleMania Axxess, the winner of the NXT Women's Championship Invitational received an NXT Women's Championship match on the morning of April 8, 2018. The defending champion, Shayna Baszler, was determined the night before at NXT TakeOver: New Orleans.

Tag Team Eliminator

At WrestleMania 34, Cesaro and Sheamus defended the Raw Tag Team Championship against Braun Strowman and a partner of his choosing. At the event, Strowman picked 10-year old Nicholas from the live audience, and the two won the titles. The following night on Raw, Strowman and Nicholas relinquished the titles due to Nicholas' schedule as a fourth grader. Cesaro and Sheamus wanted their titles back and Raw General Manager Kurt Angle decided that they could regain them in a match at Greatest Royal Rumble and their opponents would be determined by a four-team tournament, which he called the Tag Team Eliminator.

WWE United Kingdom Championship Tournament (2018)

WWE SmackDown Tag Team Championship Tournament (2018)

NXT UK Women's Championship Tournament

WWE World Cup

The WWE World Cup was a tournament that took place on November 2, 2018, at Crown Jewel in Saudi Arabia. Four participants came from Raw and four participants came from SmackDown. In the tournament finals, Shane McMahon defeated Dolph Ziggler to be crowned "Best In The World".

NXT UK Tag Team Championship Tournament

WWE Worlds Collide Tournament

WWE Cruiserweight Championship #1 Contender Tournament

This tournament is to determine the #1 Contender for Buddy Murphy's WWE Cruiserweight Championship. On the February 19 episode of 205 Live, General Manager Drake Maverick scheduled an eight-man single elimination tournament with the winner facing Buddy Murphy for the WWE Cruiserweight Championship at WrestleMania 35.

NXT Breakout Tournament (2019)
The NXT Breakout Tournament is a tournament composed of eight members of the WWE Performance Center who are making their NXT TV debuts. The winner of the tournament will receive a title match of their choice.  The tournament returned in 2021 and the first round started on the July 13, 2021 episode.

Interim NXT Cruiserweight Championship Tournament

A round-robin tournament began on April 15, 2020, to determine the interim NXT Cruiserweight Champion after Jordan Devlin was deemed unable to defend the title due to COVID-19 pandemic-related travel restrictions. Eight wrestlers were split into two groups of four, where each wrestler competed against the other three members of their group. The wrestler with the best record in each group would compete to determine the interim champion. Any ties will be broken by head-to-head results. Group A consists of Kushida, Tony Nese, Jake Atlas, and Drake Maverick, while Group B consists of Isaiah "Swerve" Scott, El Hijo del Fantasma, Akira Tozawa, and Gentleman Jack Gallagher. Although Maverick was released from WWE on April 15, he confirmed via Twitter that he would still be competing in the tournament, which could be his last matches in the company.

WWE Intercontinental Championship Tournament (2020) 
On May 12, 2020, the Intercontinental Championship was declared vacant after champion Sami Zayn elected to refrain from competing during the COVID-19 pandemic. A tournament to crown a new champion was then set to begin on the May 15 episode of SmackDown.

† Neither Jeff Hardy nor Elias were able to compete in the semifinals, as Elias was (kayfabe) injured in a car crash and Hardy was accused of causing it and arrested. AJ Styles and Daniel Bryan were given the option of having a bye in the tournament. Styles opted for the bye to automatically advance to the final on June 12 while Bryan opted to have a new opponent; Sheamus subsequently won a battle royal to qualify for the vacant spot in the semifinals against Bryan that night.

NXT UK Heritage Cup Championship Tournament

NXT Breakout Tournament (2021)
The NXT Breakout Tournament is a tournament composed of eight members of the WWE Performance Center who are making their NXT TV debuts. The second annual tournament began on the July 13, 2021 episode of NXT.

NXT UK Heritage Cup #1 Contender Tournament

RK-Bro-nament

NXT Women's Breakout Tournament (2022)
The NXT Women’s Breakout Tournament is a tournament composed of eight female wrestlers from the NXT brand. The inaugural tournament began on the May 10, 2022 episode of NXT 2.0. The winner earns a contract and can cash-in for the NXT Women's Championship at any time. The inaugural winner is Roxanne Perez. She defeated Tiffany Stratton on the June 7 episode of NXT 2.0.

† Nikkita Lyons was injured during training and her semi-final opponent, Fallon Henley, originally got a bye to the finals but, Tiffany Stratton challenged Henley to earn her spot in the finals in which Stratton then replaced Lyons in the tournament

WWE Women's Tag Team Championship Tournament (2022)

NXT United Kingdom Championship Tournament (2022)

SmackDown World Cup
The SmackDown World Cup was an eight-man single-elimination tournament composed of eight wrestlers from the SmackDown brand. The inaugural tournament began on the November 11, 2022 episode of SmackDown. The winner earned a Intercontinental Championship match against Gunther. The inaugural winner was Ricochet, who defeated Santos Escobar on the December 2, 2022 episode of SmackDown.

WWE SmackDown Tag Team Championship #1 Contender Tournament (2023) 

† Drew McIntyre and Sheamus were attacked by The Viking Raiders (Erik and Ivar). Braun Strowman and Ricochet replaced McIntyre and Sheamus in the tournament.

King of the Ring 

King of the Ring is a professional wrestling single-elimination tournament held by WWE. It was held annually from 1985 to 2002 (excluding 1990 and 1992) and from 1993 to 2002 the tournament was produced as a pay-per-view event.

Tournaments have since been held periodically - in 2006, 2008, 2010, 2015, 2019, and 2021

Dates and venues of finals

Queen's Crown

In 2021, WWE debuted the Queen's Crown tournament for female wrestlers considered to be the counterpart to King of the Ring. Zelina Vega was the inaugural winner, defeating Doudrop at Crown Jewel 2021, which took place on October 21 at Mohammed Abdu Arena on the Boulevard in Riyadh, Saudi Arabia.

Dusty Rhodes Tag Team Classic

The Dusty Rhodes Tag Team Classic is an annual tag team tournament featured on the NXT brand and is named after WWE Hall of Famer Dusty Rhodes, who died in 2015.

Exclusively for male wrestlers from 2015 to 2020, a female version of the tournament debuted in 2021, running simultaneously with the men's version.

Dates and venues of finals

Mae Young Classic

The Mae Young Classic is an all-women's tournament produced by WWE. The event is named for WWE Hall of Famer Mae Young.

Dates and venues

Mixed Match Challenge

See also
List of WWE pay-per-view and WWE Network events

References

 
Tournaments